The New York–Penn League (NYPL) was a Minor League Baseball league that operated in the northeastern United States from 1939 to 2020. Classified as a Class A Short Season league, its season started in June, after major-league teams signed their amateur draft picks to professional contracts, and ended in early September.

In 2019, its last season of operation, the NYPL had 14 teams from eight different states. In addition to New York and Pennsylvania, from which the league drew its name, the NYPL also had clubs in Maryland, Massachusetts, Ohio, Vermont, West Virginia, and Connecticut.

The Brooklyn Cyclones were the last NYPL champions, defeating the Lowell Spinners, two games to one, in 2019. The Oneonta Yankees/Tigers won 12 championships, the most among all teams in the league, followed by the Auburn Mets/Twins/Phillies/Doubledays (8) and Jamestown Falcons/Expos (7).

History
The New York–Penn League was founded in 1939 as the Pennsylvania–Ontario–New York League, generally shortened to PONY League, in a hotel in Batavia, New York. The original teams included the Batavia Clippers, Bradford Bees, Hamilton Red Wings, Jamestown Jaguars, Niagara Falls Rainbows, and Olean Oilers; all were based in or near Western New York.  The Oilers, a Brooklyn Dodgers affiliate, won both the regular season and playoff championships. Batavia was the last remaining charter city in the league when it ceased operations after the 2020 season.

The Hamilton Red Wings folded early in the 1956 season, and with no more teams in Ontario, the circuit became the New York–Penn League in 1957.  The league crossed back into Canada with the formation of the St. Catharines Blue Jays in 1986.  They were joined by the Hamilton Redbirds in 1987 and the Welland Pirates in 1989, but all three clubs had moved back to the United States by 2000.

The New York–Penn circuit was originally a Class D league (the minors' lowest classification through 1962). It was a full-season Class A league from 1963 through 1966, and became a short-season Class A league in 1967.

The start of the 2020 season was postponed due to the COVID-19 pandemic before being cancelled on June 30.

Disbanding
On December 9, 2020, Major League Baseball (MLB) announced its list of 120 teams invited to be a part of the minors after restructuring for the 2021 season. As first reported in 2019, the NYPL ceased operations. The Aberdeen IronBirds, Brooklyn Cyclones, and Hudson Valley Renegades joined the new High-A East, becoming the new High-A affiliates of the Baltimore Orioles, New York Mets, and New York Yankees respectively. The Mahoning Valley Scrappers, State College Spikes, West Virginia Black Bears, and Williamsport Crosscutters moved to the new MLB Draft League for players wishing to showcase themselves to MLB teams in advance of the annual draft. The Tri-City ValleyCats moved to the independent Frontier League, while the Batavia Muckdogs and Auburn Doubledays joined the Perfect Game Collegiate Baseball League. On February 25, 2021, the Vermont Lake Monsters announced that they would join the Futures Collegiate Baseball League (FCBL) under new ownership, and the Norwich Sea Unicorns joined the FCBL in late April. The Staten Island Yankees folded, while the Lowell Spinners were left without future plans.

Final franchises

Champions

League champions were determined by different means during the New York–Penn League's 82-year run from 1939 to 2020. For a few seasons in the 1960s and 1970s, no playoffs were held and the league champions were simply the regular season pennant winners. Most seasons, however, ended with playoffs to determine a league champion.

The Oneonta Tigers won 12 championships, the most among all teams in the league, followed by the Auburn Mets/Twins/Phillies/Doubledays (8) and Jamestown Falcons/Expos (7).

Teams

Aberdeen IronBirds
Auburn Americans
Auburn Astros
Auburn Doubledays
Auburn Mets
Auburn Phillies
Auburn Red Stars
Auburn Sunsets
Auburn Twins
Auburn Yankees
Batavia Clippers
Batavia Indians
Batavia Muckdogs
Batavia Pirates
Batavia Trojans
Binghamton Triplets
Bradford Beagles
Bradford Bees
Bradford Blue Wings
Bradford Phillies
Bradford Yankees
Brooklyn Cyclones
Connecticut Tigers
Corning Athletics
Corning Cor-Sox
Corning Independents
Corning Red Sox
Corning Royals
Elmira Pioneers
Erie Cardinals
Erie Orioles
Erie Sailors
Erie Senators
Geneva Cubs
Geneva Pirates
Geneva Redlegs
Geneva Senators
Geneva Twins
Glens Falls Redbirds
Hamilton Cardinals
Hamilton Redbirds
Hamilton Red Wings
Hornell Dodgers
Hornell Maple Leafs
Hornell Maples
Hornell Redlegs
Hudson Valley Renegades
Jamestown Braves
Jamestown Dodgers
Jamestown Expos
Jamestown Falcons
Jamestown Jaguars
Jamestown Jammers
Jamestown Tigers
Little Falls Mets
Lockport Cubs
Lockport Reds
Lockport White Socks
Lockport White Sox
London Pirates
Lowell Spinners
Mahoning Valley Scrappers
New Jersey Cardinals
Newark Co-Pilots
Newark Orioles
Niagara Falls Pirates
Niagara Falls Rainbows
Niagara Falls Rapids
Niagara Falls Sox
Olean A's
Olean Giants
Olean Oilers
Olean Red Sox
Olean Yankees
Oneonta Red Sox
Oneonta Tigers
Oneonta Yankees
Pittsfield Astros
Pittsfield Mets
Queens Kings
St. Catharines Blue Jays
St. Catharines Stompers
State College Spikes
Staten Island Yankees
Tri-City ValleyCats
Utica Blue Jays
Utica Blue Sox
Vermont Expos
Vermont Lake Monsters
Watertown Indians
Watertown Pirates
Welland Pirates
Wellsville Braves
Wellsville Nitros
Wellsville Red Sox
Wellsville Rockets
Wellsville Senators
Wellsville Yankees
West Virginia Black Bears
Williamsport Astros
Williamsport Crosscutters
Williamsport Cubs
Williamsport Red Sox
York White Roses

Cities represented

Connecticut
Norwich: 2010–2020 (16 seasons)

Maryland
Aberdeen: 2002–2020 (19 seasons)

Massachusetts
Lowell: 1996–2020 (25 seasons)
Pittsfield: 1989–2001 (13 seasons)

New Jersey
Augusta: 1994–2005 (12 seasons)

New York
Auburn: 1958–1980, 1982–2020 (62 seasons)
Batavia: 1939–1953, 1957–1959, 1961–2020 (78 seasons)
Binghamton: 1964–1966 (3 seasons)
Brooklyn: 2001–2020 (20 seasons)
Corning: 1951–1960, 1968–1969 (12 seasons)
Elmira: 1957–1961, 1973–1995 (28 seasons)
Fishkill: 1994–2020 (26 seasons)
Geneva: 1958–1973, 1977–1993 (33 seasons)
Glens Falls: 1993 (1 season)
Jamestown: 1939–1957, 1962–1973, 1977–2014 (67 seasons)
Hornell: 1942–1957 (16 seasons)
Little Falls: 1977–1988 (12 seasons)
Lockport: 1942–1950 (9 seasons)
Newark: 1968–1979, 1983–1987 (17 seasons) 
Niagara Falls: 1939–1940, 1970–1979, 1982–1985, 1989–1993 (21 seasons)
Olean: 1939–1959, 1961–1966 (27 seasons)
Oneonta: 1966–2009 (44 seasons)
Queens: 2000 (1 season)
Staten Island: 1999–2020 (22 seasons)
Troy: 2002–2020 (18 seasons)
Utica: 1977–2001 (25 seasons)
Watertown: 1983–1998 (16 seasons)
Wellsville: 1942–1961, 1963–1965 (23 seasons)

Ohio
Youngstown: 1999–2020 (22 seasons)

Pennsylvania
Bradford: 1939–1942, 1944–1957 (18 seasons)
Erie: 1954–1963, 1967, 1981–1993, 1995–1998 (28 seasons)
State College: 2006–2020 (15 seasons)
Williamsport: 1968–1972, 1994–2020 (32 seasons)
York: 1923–1933, 1936 (moved to Trenton July 2) (12 seasons)

Vermont
Burlington: 1994–2020 (27 seasons)

West Virginia
Morgantown: 2015–2020 (6 seasons)

Ontario
Hamilton: 1939–1942, 1946–1956, 1988–1992 (20 seasons)
London: 1940–1942 (2 seasons)
St. Catharines: 1986–1999 (14 seasons)
Welland: 1989–1994 (5 seasons)

Hall of Fame

The New York–Penn League Hall of Fame was established in 2012 to honor league players, managers, and executives for their accomplishments or contributions to the league in playing or administrative roles. The Hall of Fame inducted its first class of seven men in 2012. New members were elected before the start of each season.

Notes

References

External links

 

 
1939 establishments in the United States
2020 disestablishments in the United States
Baseball leagues in Connecticut
Baseball leagues in Massachusetts
Baseball leagues in New York (state)
Baseball leagues in Ohio
Baseball leagues in Pennsylvania
Baseball leagues in Vermont
Baseball leagues in West Virginia
Defunct minor baseball leagues in the United States
Sports leagues disestablished in 2020
Sports leagues established in 1939